Mahmut Sadi Irmak (May 15, 1904, Seydişehir – November 11, 1990, Istanbul) was a Turkish academic in physiology, politician and former Prime Minister of Turkey.

Biography
He was born in the town Seydişehir of Konya, Ottoman Empire in 1904. He became teacher for biology after finishing the college in Konya. However, he quit his job the same year and attended the Law School at Istanbul University.  Mustafa Kemal Atatürk wanted to send 50 of his students abroad for a good education in 1925.  A test was held for this throughout Turkey.  Sadi was among those who took the exam and was chosen.  When Sadi got on the train, he refused to go.  Just then, a telegram arrived.  Sadi read Atatürk's words: I send you as a spark, you should return as a flame. That words affected Sadi. And he decided to go again. He went to Germany on a state granted scholarship to study biology and medicine. He graduated from the University of Berlin in 1929 with a degree in medicine. After completing his study, Sadi Irmak worked as an assistant physician in hospitals in Hagen and Düsseldorf, Germany. Irmak was fascinated by the Nazis and was a prominent proponent of eugenics.

Returned to Turkey, he worked as a government physician and teacher for biology. In 1932, he became a lecturer at the School of Medicine of Istanbul University, and in 1939, he was promoted to full professor for physiology.

Political career
Sadi Irmak entered politics in 1943 as deputy of Konya. Between June 7, 1945 and August 5, 1946, he served as Minister of Labor in the cabinet of Şükrü Saracoğlu. He returned to the faculty, however, in 1950, to lecture first in Munich, Germany and then in Istanbul again. In 1974, he was admitted to the Senate. The same year, Sadi Irmak was commissioned by President Fahri Korutürk to form the 38th government of Turkey. The caretaker government under his prime ministry lasted from November 17, 1974 until his resignation on March 31, 1975 due to a vote of no confidence in the parliament. After the military coup on September 12, 1980, he was elected to the Consultative Assembly. He acted as its speaker from October 27, 1981 until December 4, 1983.

Sadi Irmak died on November 11, 1990 in Istanbul, and was buried at the Aşiyan Asri Cemetery. He was survived by his wife and two children. His daughter, Prof. Yakut Irmak Özden, is director of the Institute for Atatürk's Ideology and History of His Reforms at Istanbul University.

Notes

References
 Sadi Irmak's Biography

External links
 Turkish Grand National Assembly official website 

1904 births
1990 deaths
20th-century prime ministers of Turkey
People from Seydişehir
Republican People's Party (Turkey) politicians
Darülfünun alumni
Istanbul University Faculty of Law alumni
Academic staff of Gazi Eğitim Enstitüsü
Academic staff of Istanbul University
Prime Ministers of Turkey
Ministers of Labour and Social Security of Turkey
Speakers of the Parliament of Turkey
Turkish physiologists
Burials at Aşiyan Asri Cemetery
Members of the 38th government of Turkey
Members of the 14th government of Turkey
Members of the 15th government of Turkey